Big Pharma may refer to:

 Big Pharma conspiracy theories
 Pharmaceutical industry
 Pharmaceutical lobby
 Pharmaceutical Research and Manufacturers of America (PhRMA), a trade group
 Big Pharma (book), a 2006 book by British journalist Jacky Law
 Big Pharma (video game), a simulation game
 Big Pharma (artist), an electronic music artist

See also 
 List of conspiracy theories
 List of pharmaceutical companies